is a passenger railway station located in the city of Takamatsu, Kagawa, Japan.  It is operated by the private transportation company Takamatsu-Kotohira Electric Railroad (Kotoden) and is designated station "S05".

Lines
Katamoto Station is a station of the Kotoden Shido Line and is located 4.5 km from the opposing terminus of the line at Kawaramachi Station].

Layout
The station consists of one side platform serving a single bi-directional track. The station is unmanned.

Adjacent stations

History
Katamoto Station opened on March 16, 1931.

Surrounding area
Japan National Route 11
TShikoku Electric Power Training Institute
 Yashima General Hospital

See also
 List of railway stations in Japan

References

External links

  

Railway stations in Takamatsu
Railway stations in Japan opened in 1931
Stations of Takamatsu-Kotohira Electric Railroad